Sally Hampton (born July 29, 1958 in St. Louis, Missouri) is an American writer and film producer living in the View Park Windsor-Hills neighborhood of Los Angeles.

She is the writer (with Haris Orkin) and producer (with Iain Paterson) of the ABC/Wonderful World of Disney movie "A Saintly Switch" (1999), which she dedicated to the memory of her first husband, Dave Waymer. She also wrote (together with Ben Cardinale) and produced "Living Straight" (2003).

The Caucus for Television Producers, Writers & Directors honored Sally Hampton with the Distinguished Service Award presented at the Beverly Hills Hotel December 7, 2007.

Filmography
Hampton's acting performances included episodes of the television shows:
 "A Million to Juan"
 "Adam 12"
 "Dragnet"
 "The Law and Harry McGraw"
 "Simon & Simon"
 "Knight Rider"
 "Airwolf"
 "The Dukes of Hazzard"
 "Bare Essence"
 "Trapper John, M.D."
 "The Devlin Connection"

References

External links
Yahoo! Movies: Sally Hampton

The Caucus for Television Producers, Writers & Directors – 25th Annual Silver Anniversary Awards Dinner

1958 births
Living people
American women screenwriters
American women film producers
21st-century American women